Jajangmyeon or jjajangmyeon is a Chinese-Korean noodle dish topped with a thick sauce made of chunjang, diced pork, and vegetables. It originated in Incheon, Korea where Chinese migrant workers started making zhajiangmian (noodles served with fried bean sauce) in the late 19th century. Modifications in Korea such as a darker and sweeter sauce differentiate the Korean dish from the Chinese version. Variants of the dish use seafood, or other meats.

History 
Jajangmyeon was brought to Incheon, Korea during the late nineteenth century by migrant workers from Shandong province, China. At a time when both Qing and Japanese businesses were competing against each other, Jajangmyeon was offered in 1905 at Gonghwachun, a Chinese restaurant in Incheon Chinatown run by an immigrant from the Shandong region. The restaurant is now the Jajangmyeon Museum.

Both the name and dish originate from the Chinese zhájiàngmiàn. The common features of both are pork, long wheat noodles, and a sauce made from fermented soybean paste. Originally the sauce that was introduced from China to make the noodle dish, had tasted saltier and was also of a brownish colour. The chefs at Incheon, Korea later added in caramel to sweeten it up as well as adding in grains, that darkened the sauce to looking jet black over time. Yong Chen, an associate history professor at the University of California, Irvine, has said that although the dish "began as the Northern Chinese noodle-and-ground pork dish zhájiàngmiàn, today it is thoroughly Korean."

In the mid-50s in South Korea, immediately after the Korean War, jajangmyeon was sold at low prices so that anyone could eat it without burden.  The new Korean-style jajangmyeon began to gain explosive popularity among the many merchants visiting the port of Incheon, which was the center of trade, and the many dock workers working in the fish market, and quickly spread throughout the country.

Name 
Jajang (alternatively spelled jjajang ) is derived from the Chinese word zhájiàng, which means "fried sauce".  Myeon means "noodles". The Chinese characters are pronounced jak and jang in Korean, but the noodle dish is called jajangmyeon, not jakjangmyeon, because its origin is not the Sino-Korean word, but a transliteration of the Chinese pronunciation. As the Chinese pronunciation of zhá sounded like jja (rather than ja) to Korean ears, the dish is known in South Korea as jjajangmyeon, and the vast majority of Korean Chinese restaurants use this spelling.

For many years, until 22 August 2011, the National Institute of Korean Language did not recognize the word jjajangmyeon as an accepted idiomatic transliteration. The reason jjajangmyeon did not become the standard spelling was due to the transliteration rules for foreign words announced in 1986 by the Ministry of Education, which stated that the foreign obstruents should not be transliterated using doubled consonants except for some established usages. The lack of acknowledgment faced tough criticism from the supporters of the spelling jjajangmyeon, such as Ahn Do-hyeon, a Sowol Poetry Prize winning poet. Later, jjajangmyeon was accepted as an alternative standard spelling alongside jajangmyeon in the National Language Deliberation Council and, on 31 August, included as a standard spelling in the Standard Korean Language Dictionary.

Preparation and serving 

Jajangmyeon uses thick, hand-made or machine-pulled noodles made from wheat flour, salt, baking soda, and water. The sauce, jajang, is made with fried chunjang with other ingredients, such as soy sauce (or oyster sauce), meat (usually pork, but sometimes beef), seafood (usually squid or shrimp), fragrants (scallions, ginger, and garlic), vegetables (usually onions, zucchini or Korean zucchini, or cabbage), stock, and starch slurry.

When served, jajangmyeon may be topped with julienned cucumber, scallions, egg garnish, boiled or fried egg, blanched shrimp or stir-fried bamboo shoot slices. The dish is usually served with danmuji (yellow pickled radish), sliced raw onions, and chunjang sauce for dipping the onions.

Variations 
Variations of the jajangmyeon dish include gan-jjajang, jaengban-jjajang, yuni-jjajang, and samseon-jjajang.
 Gan-jjajang – Jajangmyeon with a dry sauce, made without adding water (stock) and starch slurry. The letter gan comes from the Chinese pronunciation of the character  (reading: , geon;; reading: gān) meaning "dry".
 Jaengban-jjajang – Jajangmyeon made by stir-frying the parboiled noodles with the sauce in a wok, and served on a plate instead of in a bowl. Jaengban means "plate" in Korean.
 Yuni-jjajang – Jajangmyeon made with ground meat. The word yuni derived from the Korean reading of the Chinese word ròuní (Korean reading: , yungni) meaning "ground meat". Although yungni is not a word in Korean, the loanword yuni, used only in the dish name yuni-jjajang, is likely to have been derived from Chinese immigrants' pronunciation of the Korean reading of the word, with the dropping of the coda k (or ng, due to the Korean phonotactics) which is difficult for native Mandarin speakers to pronounce.
 Samseon-jjajang – Jajangmyeon which incorporates seafood such as squid and mussel. The word samseon derives from the Korean reading of the Chinese word sānxiān meaning "three fresh ingredients".
There can be combinations. For example. samseon-gan-jjajang may refer to seafood jajangmyeon made without adding water.

Dishes such as jajang-bap and jajang-tteok-bokki also exist. Jajang-bap is essentially the same dish as jajangmyeon, but served with rice instead of noodles. Jajang-tteok-bokki is tteok-bokki served with jajang sauce instead of the usual spicy sauce. Bul jajangmyeon is a spicy variation of jajangmyeon.

Instant jajangmyeon products, such as Chapagetti, Chacharoni, and Zha Wang, are instant noodle versions of jajangmyeon consisting of dried noodles that are boiled in the same manner as ramyeon, using dried vegetable pieces that are drained and mixed with jajang powder or liquid jajang sauce, as well as a small amount of water and oil.

See also 

 Black Day
 Zhajiangmian
 Jajamen

References

External links 

Korean Chinese cuisine
Chinese noodle dishes
Korean noodle dishes
Mixed noodles